This page lists all described species of the spider family Theridiosomatidae accepted by the World Spider Catalog :

A

Andasta

Andasta Simon, 1895
 A. benoiti (Roberts, 1978) — Seychelles
 A. cyclosina Simon, 1901 — Malaysia
 A. semiargentea Simon, 1895 (type) — Sri Lanka
 A. siltte Saaristo, 1996 — Seychelles

B

Baalzebub

Baalzebub Coddington, 1986
 B. acutum Prete, Cizauskas & Brescovit, 2016 — Brazil
 B. albonotatus (Petrunkevitch, 1930) — Puerto Rico
 B. baubo Coddington, 1986 (type) — Costa Rica, Panama, Brazil
 B. brauni (Wunderlich, 1976) — Australia (Queensland)
 B. nemesis Miller, Griswold & Yin, 2009 — China
 B. rastrarius Zhao & Li, 2012 — China
 B. youyiensis Zhao & Li, 2012 — China
 † B. mesozoicum Penney, 2014

C

Chthonopes

Chthonopes Wunderlich, 2011
 C. cavernicola Wunderlich, 2011 — Laos
 C. jaegeri Wunderlich, 2011 (type) — Laos
 C. thakekensis Lin, Li & Jäger, 2014 — Laos

Chthonos

Chthonos Coddington, 1986
 C. kuyllur Dupérré & Tapia, 2017 — Ecuador
 C. pectorosa (O. Pickard-Cambridge, 1882) (type) — Brazil
 C. peruana (Keyserling, 1886) — Peru
 C. quinquemucronata (Simon, 1893) — Brazil
 C. tuberosa (Keyserling, 1886) — Brazil

Coddingtonia

Coddingtonia Miller, Griswold & Yin, 2009
 C. anaktakun Labarque & Griswold, 2014 — Malaysia
 C. discobulbus (Wunderlich, 2011) — Laos
 C. erhuan Feng & Lin, 2019 — China
 C. euryopoides Miller, Griswold & Yin, 2009 (type) — China
 C. huifengi Feng & Lin, 2019 — Indonesia (Sumatra)
 C. lizu Feng & Lin, 2019 — China (Hainan)

Cuacuba

Cuacuba Prete, Cizauskas & Brescovit, 2018
 C. mariana Prete, Cizauskas & Brescovit, 2018 (type) — Brazil
 C. morrodopilar Prete, Cizauskas & Brescovit, 2018 — Brazil
 C. ribeira Prete & Brescovit, 2020 — Brazil

E

† Eoepeirotypus

† Eoepeirotypus Wunderlich, 2004
 † E. retrobulbus Wunderlich, 2004

† Eotheridiosoma

† Eotheridiosoma Wunderlich, 2004
 † E. hamatum Wunderlich, 2011 
 † E. tuber Wunderlich, 2004 
 † E. volutum Wunderlich, 2004

Epeirotypus

Epeirotypus O. Pickard-Cambridge, 1894
 E. brevipes O. Pickard-Cambridge, 1894 (type) — Mexico to Costa Rica
 E. chavarria Coddington, 1986 — Costa Rica
 E. dalong Miller, Griswold & Yin, 2009 — China

Epilineutes

Epilineutes Coddington, 1986
 E. globosus (O. Pickard-Cambridge, 1896) (type) — Mexico to Brazil

K

Karstia

Karstia Chen, 2010
 K. coddingtoni (Zhu, Zhang & Chen, 2001) — China
 K. cordata Dou & Lin, 2012 — China
 K. nitida Zhao & Li, 2012 — China
 K. prolata Zhao & Li, 2012 — China
 K. upperyangtzica Chen, 2010 (type) — China

M

Menglunia

Menglunia Zhao & Li, 2012
 M. inaffecta Zhao & Li, 2012 (type) — China

N

Naatlo

Naatlo Coddington, 1986
 N. fauna (Simon, 1897) — Costa Rica, Panama, Colombia, Venezuela, Trinidad and Tobago, Ecuador, Peru, Brazil
 N. maturaca Rodrigues & Lise, 2008 — Brazil
 N. mayzana Dupérré & Tapia, 2017 — Ecuador
 N. serrana Rodrigues & Lise, 2008 — Brazil
 N. splendida (Taczanowski, 1879) — Panama, Colombia, Venezuela, French Guiana, Ecuador, Peru, Bolivia, Brazil
 N. sutila Coddington, 1986 (type) — Panama, Colombia, Venezuela, Trinidad and Tobago, Suriname, Peru, Brazil, Argentina
 N. sylvicola (Hingston, 1932) — Venezuela, Trinidad and Tobago, Guyana

O

Ogulnius

Ogulnius O. Pickard-Cambridge, 1882
 O. barbandrewsi Miller, Griswold & Yin, 2009 — China
 O. clarus Keyserling, 1886 — Brazil
 O. cubanus Archer, 1958 — Cuba
 O. fulvus Bryant, 1945 — Hispaniola
 O. gertschi Archer, 1953 — Panama
 O. gloriae (Petrunkevitch, 1930) — Puerto Rico
 O. hapalus Zhao & Li, 2012 — China
 O. hayoti Lopez, 1994 — Martinique
 O. infumatus Simon, 1898 — St. Vincent
 O. laranka Dupérré & Tapia, 2017 — Ecuador
 O. latus Bryant, 1948 — Hispaniola
 O. obscurus Keyserling, 1886 — Peru, Brazil
 O. obtectus O. Pickard-Cambridge, 1882 (type) — Brazil, Colombia, Peru
 O. paku Dupérré & Tapia, 2017 — Ecuador
 O. pallisteri Archer, 1953 — Peru
 O. pullus Bösenberg & Strand, 1906 — Korea, Japan
 O. tetrabunus (Archer, 1965) — Jamaica
 O. yaginumai Brignoli, 1981 — Philippines

P

† Palaeoepeirotypus

† Palaeoepeirotypus Wunderlich, 1988
 † P. iuvenis Wunderlich, 1988 
 † P. iuvenoides Wunderlich, 1988

Parogulnius

Parogulnius Archer, 1953
 P. hypsigaster Archer, 1953 (type) — USA

Plato

Plato Coddington, 1986
 P. bicolor (Keyserling, 1886) — Brazil
 P. bruneti (Gertsch, 1960) — Trinidad
 P. ferriferus Prete, Cizauskas & Brescovit, 2018 — Brazil
 P. guacharo (Brignoli, 1972) — Venezuela
 P. juberthiei Lopez, 1996 — French Guiana
 P. miranda (Brignoli, 1972) — Venezuela
 P. novalima Prete, Cizauskas & Brescovit, 2018 — Brazil
 P. striatus Prete, Cizauskas & Brescovit, 2018 — Brazil
 P. troglodita Coddington, 1986 (type) — Ecuador

S

Sinoalaria

Sinoalaria Zhao & Li, 2014
 S. bicornis (Lin, Li & Jäger, 2014) — Laos
 S. cavernicola (Lin, Li & Jäger, 2014) — Laos
 S. chengguanensis (Zhao & Li, 2012) (type) — China
 S. navicularis (Lin, Li & Jäger, 2014) — Laos

† Spinitheridiosoma

† Spinitheridiosoma Wunderlich, 2004
 † S. balticum Wunderlich, 2004 
 † S. bispinosum Wunderlich, 2004 
 † S. rima Wunderlich, 2004

T

Tagalogonia

Tagalogonia Labarque & Griswold, 2014
 T. banahaw Labarque & Griswold, 2014 (type) — Philippines
 T. isarog Labarque & Griswold, 2014 — Philippines

Theridiosoma

Theridiosoma O. Pickard-Cambridge, 1879
 T. alboannulatum Suzuki, Serita & Hiramatsu, 2020 — Japan (Ryukyu Is.)
 T. ankas Dupérré & Tapia, 2017 — Ecuador
 T. argenteolunulatum Simon, 1897 — Caribbean, Venezuela
 T. blaisei Simon, 1903 — Gabon
 T. caaguara Rodrigues & Ott, 2005 — Brazil
 T. chiripa Rodrigues & Ott, 2005 — Brazil
 T. circuloargenteum Wunderlich, 1976 — Australia (New South Wales)
 T. concolor Keyserling, 1884 — Mexico, Brazil
 T. davisi Archer, 1953 — Mexico
 T. dissimulatum Suzuki, Serita & Hiramatsu, 2020 — Japan (Ryukyu Is.)
 T. diwang Miller, Griswold & Yin, 2009 — China
 T. epeiroides Bösenberg & Strand, 1906 — Russia (Far East), Korea, Japan
 T. esmeraldas Dupérré & Tapia, 2017 — Ecuador
 T. fasciatum Workman, 1896 — Singapore, Indonesia (Sumatra)
 T. fulvum Suzuki, Serita & Hiramatsu, 2020 — Japan
 T. gemmosum (L. Koch, 1877) (type) — North America, Europe, Turkey, Caucasus, Iran, Japan
 T. genevensium (Brignoli, 1972) — Sri Lanka
 T. goodnightorum Archer, 1953 — Mexico to Costa Rica
 T. kikuyu Brignoli, 1979 — Kenya
 T. kullki Dupérré & Tapia, 2017 — Ecuador
 T. latebricola Locket, 1968 — Angola
 T. lopdelli Marples, 1955 — Samoa
 T. lucidum Simon, 1897 — Venezuela
 T. nebulosum Simon, 1901 — Malaysia
 T. nechodomae Petrunkevitch, 1930 — Jamaica, Puerto Rico
 T. obscurum (Keyserling, 1886) — Brazil
 T. paludicola Suzuki, Serita & Hiramatsu, 2020 — Japan
 T. picteti Simon, 1893 — Indonesia (Sumatra)
 T. plumarium Zhao & Li, 2012 — China
 T. sacha Dupérré & Tapia, 2017 — Ecuador
 T. sancristobalensis Baert, 2014 — Ecuador (Galapagos Is.)
 T. savannum Chamberlin & Ivie, 1944 — USA
 T. shuangbi Miller, Griswold & Yin, 2009 — China
 T. triumphale Zhao & Li, 2012 — China (Hainan), Taiwan (Orchid Is./Lanyu)
 T. vimineum Zhao & Li, 2012 — China
 T. zygops (Chamberlin & Ivie, 1936) — Panama
 † T. incompletum Wunderlich, 1988

U

† Umerosoma

† Umerosoma Wunderlich, 2004
 † U. multispina Wunderlich, 2004

W

Wendilgarda

Wendilgarda Keyserling, 1886
 W. assamensis Fage, 1924 — India, China
 W. atricolor (Simon, 1907) — São Tomé and Príncipe
 W. clara Keyserling, 1886 — Caribbean, Guatemala to Brazil
 W. galapagensis Archer, 1953 — Costa Rica (Cocos Is.)
 W. liliwensis Barrion & Litsinger, 1995 — Philippines
 W. mexicana Keyserling, 1886 (type) — Mexico, Central America, Cuba
 W. muji Miller, Griswold & Yin, 2009 — China
 W. mustelina Simon, 1898 — St. Vincent
 W. m. arnouxi Lopez & Emerit, 1986 — Guadeloupe
 W. nigra Keyserling, 1886 — Brazil
 W. nipponica Shinkai, 2009 — Japan
 W. panjanensis Barrion, Barrion-Dupo & Heong, 2013 — China (Hainan)
 W. ruficeps Suzuki, 2019 — Japan
 W. sinensis Zhu & Wang, 1992 — China

Z

Zoma

Zoma Saaristo, 1996
 Z. dibaiyin Miller, Griswold & Yin, 2009 — China, Japan
 Z. fascia Zhao & Li, 2012 — China
 Z. taiwanica (Zhang, Zhu & Tso, 2006) — Taiwan
 Z. zoma Saaristo, 1996 (type) — Seychelles

References

Theridiosomatidae